Blublu is a small village on São Tomé Island in São Tomé and Príncipe. Its population is 19 (2012 census). It lies 0.7 km southeast of Bobo Forro and 3 km southwest of the city centre of the capital São Tomé.

Population history

References

Populated places in Mé-Zóchi District